Ornithodoros sawaii is a species of argasid tick that is parasitic on streaked shearwater and Swinhoe's storm petrel seabirds in Japan and Korea. The species name honors Hirofumi Sawa of Hokkaido University in Sapporo, Japan.

References

Ticks
Arachnids of Asia
Animals described in 1973